The Women's downhill competition of the 2018 Winter Paralympics was held at Jeongseon Alpine Centre,
South Korea. The competition took place on 10 March 2018.

Medal table

Visually impaired
In the downhill visually impaired, the athlete with a visual impairment has a sighted guide. The two skiers are considered a team, and dual medals are awarded.

The race was started at 09:30.

Standing
The race was started at 09:47.

Sitting
The race was started at 10:17.

See also
Alpine skiing at the 2018 Winter Olympics

References

Women's downhill
Para